Rahim Ememi (born 17 May 1982) is an Iranian professional cyclist, who is currently suspended from the sport due to a doping infraction.

Doping
On February 10, 2017, the UCI announced that Emami had tested positive for an Anabolic Androgenic Steroid during the 2016 Jelajah Malaysia and was provisionally suspended. Emami was handed a seven year and six month ban, expiring on May 24, 2024, when Emami will be 42, therefore the ban will effectively end his professional career.

Major results

2007
 3rd Overall Tour of Azerbaijan
2008
 4th Overall Milad De Nour Tour
 5th Overall Tour of Azerbaijan
 7th Overall International Presidency Tour
2009
 1st  Road race, National Road Championships
 5th Overall Tour of Azerbaijan
 9th Overall Milad De Nour Tour
2010
 6th Overall Tour of Azerbaijan
 6th Overall International Presidency Tour
2011
 1st Overall Tour de Filipinas
1st Stages 1 & 4
 2nd Overall Tour de Singkarak
 4th Overall International Presidency Tour
1st Stages 2 & 5
 5th Overall Tour de Langkawi
 6th Overall Kerman Tour
2013
 1st Overall Tour of Fuzhou
1st Stage 2
 1st Taiwan KOM Challenge
 1st  Mountains classification Tour of China I
 3rd Overall Tour de Ijen
1st Mountains classification
1st Stage 4
2014
 1st  Road race, National Road Championships
 Tour of Iran (Azerbaijan)
1st  Mountains classification
1st Stage 4
 2nd Overall Tour de Singkarak
1st Stage 4
 4th Overall Tour de East Java
2015
 1st Overall Tour of Fuzhou
 2nd Overall Tour of Japan
1st  Mountains classification
1st Stage 5
 2nd Overall Tour of Iran (Azerbaijan)
 3rd Overall Tour de Taiwan
 9th Overall Tour de Filipinas
2016
 1st Overall Tour of Fuzhou
1st Mountains classification
1st Stages 1 & 4
 2nd Overall Tour of Iran (Azerbaijan)
 4th Overall Jelajah Malaysia
1st Stage 1
 5th Overall Tour de Singkarak
1st Stage 2
 5th Overall Tour of Japan

References

External links

1982 births
Living people
Iranian male cyclists
Sportspeople from Tabriz
21st-century Iranian people